Myostaurida is a suborder of jellyfishes. It contains four families.

References 

 
Stauromedusae
Cnidarian suborders